Giuseppe Lippi (15 April 1904 – 18 May 1978) was an Italian long distance runner and steeplechaser. He was born and died in Florence.

Biography
Lippi participated at two editions of the Summer Olympics (1932 and 1936). He earned 20 caps with the national team from 1925 to 1940. He was a friend of the Italian cyclist Gino Bartali.

Achievements

National titles
Giuseppe Lippi has won 15 times the individual national championship.
1 win in 5000 metres (1932)
2 wins in 10000 metres (1938, 1939)
5 wins in 3000 metres steeplechase  (1933, 1935, 1936, 1940, 1948)
7 wins in Cross country running (1925, 1927, 1928, 1929, 1930, 1937, 1938)

See also
 Italian Athletics Championships - Multi winners
 5000 metres winners of Italian Athletics Championships
 10000 metres winners of Italian Athletics Championships

References

External links
 

1904 births
1978 deaths
Sportspeople from Florence
Italian male cross country runners
Italian male long-distance runners
Italian male steeplechase runners
Athletes (track and field) at the 1932 Summer Olympics
Athletes (track and field) at the 1936 Summer Olympics
Olympic athletes of Italy
Italian Athletics Championships winners